Meredith Leigh Alwine (born June 8, 1998) is an American weightlifter. She won the gold medal in the women's 71kg event at the 2021 World Weightlifting Championships held in Tashkent, Uzbekistan. She is also a two-time gold medalist in the women's 71kg event at the Pan American Weightlifting Championships.

Career 

In 2018, she won the silver medal in the women's 75kg event at the Junior World Weightlifting Championships held in Tashkent, Uzbekistan. In that same year, she competed in the women's 71kg event at the World Weightlifting Championships held in Ashgabat, Turkmenistan.

In 2020, she won the gold medal in the women's 71kg event at the Roma 2020 World Cup in Rome, Italy. In 2021, she won the gold medal in her event at the Pan American Weightlifting Championships held in Guayaquil, Ecuador.

She won the bronze medal in the women's 71kg event at the 2022 Pan American Weightlifting Championships held in Bogotá, Colombia. She also won the bronze medal in the Clean & Jerk event in this competition.

Achievements

References

External links 
 

Living people
1998 births
Place of birth missing (living people)
American female weightlifters
Pan American Weightlifting Championships medalists
World Weightlifting Championships medalists
21st-century American women